The 2010 season of the Cook Islands Round Cup, named the "Lotto Premier Men's Competition" for sponsorship reasons, was the thirty seventh recorded season of top flight association football competition in the Cook Islands, with any results between 1951 and 1969 and also in 1986 and 1988–1990 currently unknown. Tupapa Maraerenga won the championship, their eighth recorded championship, although other sources suggest that their victories in 1992 and 1993 were won by Takuvaine and Avatiu respectively. Nikao Sokattack were runners-up, with Takuvaine finishing in third place.

League table
Tupapa Maraerenga won the league, which was played on a round robin home and away basis.

Results

References

Cook Islands Round Cup seasons
Cook
football